The Chaco Open, Abierto del Nordeste or Northeast Open, is a golf tournament on the TPG Tour, the official professional golf tour in Argentina. First held in 1970, it has always been held at the Chaco Golf Club, in Resistencia, Chaco Province. It took a hiatus from 2008 to 2010.

Winners

External links
TPG Tour – official site

Golf tournaments in Argentina
Resistencia, Chaco